Nozuka may refer to:

Persons
George Nozuka (born 1986), American-Canadian singer songwriter and recording artist
Justin Nozuka (born 1988), American-Canadian singer-songwriter 
Philip Nozuka (1987) is an American-Canadian actor/performance artist

Places
Mount Nozuka, located in the Hidaka Mountains, Hokkaidō, Japan
Nozuka Pass, mountain pass in the south-end of the Hidaka Mountains, Hokkaidō, Japan.